The 2010–11 Wichita State Shockers men's basketball team represented Wichita State University in the 2010–11 NCAA Division I men's basketball season. A member of the Missouri Valley Conference (MVC), they were led by fourth-year head coach Gregg Marshall and played their home games at Charles Koch Arena in Wichita, Kansas. They finished the season 29–8, with a 14–4 record in MVC play, finishing in second place behind Missouri State. In the 2011 Missouri Valley Conference men's basketball tournament, they advanced to the semifinals before losing to Indiana State. The Shockers earned a 2011 National Invitation Tournament bid and a No. 4 seed. They defeated Nebraska in first round, and then earned an overtime win over Virginia Tech in the second round. They defeated the College of Charleston in the quarterfinals and earned a trip to the semi-finals in Madison Square Garden in New York City. The Shockers then upset Washington State in the semifinals, and finally, defeated top-seeded Alabama in the championship, earning their first NIT Championship in school history.

Roster

2010–11 Schedule and results
Source
 All times are Central

|-
!colspan=9 style=| Exhibition

|-
!colspan=9 style=| Regular season

|-
!colspan=9 style=| Missouri Valley tournament

|-
!colspan=9 style=| NIT

References

Wichita State Shockers men's basketball seasons
Wichita State
Wichita State
National Invitation Tournament championship seasons
Shock
Shock